Sujatha (10 December 1952 – 6 April 2011) was an Indian actress who performed and starred in a variety of unique characters in Tamil, Malayalam and Telugu films- in addition to few in Kannada and Hindi languages as well. The actress was best known for restraint and subtlety in portrayal of varied emotions. After starring in numerous Malayalam films in her mother-tongue, Sujatha later got introduced to the Tamil film industry by veteran director K. Balachander and producer P.R. Govindarajan as a protagonist in her first Tamil film, Aval Oru Thodar Kathai (1974). It was a critically acclaimed film and launched the actress's first commecrical breakthrough in her acting career. Whereas, her first Telugu picture happened to be a Telugu/Tamil bilingual titled as Guppedu Manasu (1979) in Telugu and was simultaneously shot as Nool Veli in Tamil of the same year. She died of a cardiac arrest on 6 April 2011 in Chennai (aged 58).

Early life 
Sujatha was born in a Malayali-speaking family on 10 December 1952 in Galle, Sri Lanka where she spent most of her early days of childhood over there. She participated in school plays, and later moved to Tamil Nadu when she was about 15. She acted in Ernakulam Junction, a Malayalam movie.

Career 
Sujatha made her debut in the Malayalam film Thapasvini. Her first Tamil film was Aval Oru Thodar Kathai directed by K. Balachander. She again collaborated with K. Balachander in Avargal (1977)- starring leading stars Rajinikanth and Kamal Haasan. Sujatha acted in over 240 films in five languages namely Tamil, Malayalam, Telugu, Kannada and Hindi movies. She appeared in films like Aval Our Thodar Kadhai, Annakkili, Avargal as a tortured wife, Vidhi, Mayangugiraal Oru Maadhu, Sentamizh Paattu and Aval Varuvaala, and in Telugu such as her debut in Guppedu Manasu.

Character roles 
During the 1980s, she started playing character roles, often portraying mothers. Her performances as a senior actor in films like Kodi Parakuthu, Uzhaippali, Baba in all which she played the mother of Rajinikanth; and Villain in which she played Ajith Kumar's wellwisher. Varalaru (2006) was her last film.

Death 
While undergoing treatment for a heart ailment, Sujatha died of cardiac arrest in Chennai on 6 April 2011.

Awards and honours 
Filmfare Awards South
 1975 – Filmfare Best Tamil Actress Award for Uravu Solla Oruvan
 1976 – Filmfare Best Tamil Actress Award for Annakili
 1977 – Filmfare Best Tamil Actress Award for Avargal
 1979 – Filmfare Best Telugu Actress Award for Guppedu Manasu

Nandi Awards
 1997– Nandi Award for Best Character Actress for Pelli

Tamil Nadu State Film Awards
 1981 – Special Best Actress for Thunaivi
 1982 – Special Best Actress for Paritchaikku Neramaachu

Government of Tamil Nadu
 Kalaimamani

Notable filmography

1960s

1970s

1980s

1990s

2000s 

Kannada films of Sujatha

1.) Nanna Devaru - 1982

2.) Akrosha - 1983

3.) Prema Sakshi - 1984

4.) Kanoonige Saval - 1984

5.) Rowdy Raja - 1984

6.) Super Boy(3D) - 1986

7.) Bidisada Bandha - 1989

8.) Thutta Mutta - 1998

9.) Kiccha - 2003

10.) Neelakanta - 2006

Voice artist 
 Jayapradha - Ninaithale Inikkum, 47 Natkal

References

External links 
 

1952 births
2011 deaths
20th-century Indian actresses
21st-century Indian actresses
Actresses in Tamil cinema
Actresses in Hindi cinema
Actresses in Telugu cinema
Actresses in Kannada cinema
Actresses in Malayalam cinema
Filmfare Awards South winners
Tamil Nadu State Film Awards winners
People from Galle
Indian film actresses
Nandi Award winners
Actresses from Chennai
Sri Lankan film actresses